A sideboy is a member of an even-numbered group of seamen posted in two rows at the quarterdeck when a visiting dignitary boards or leaves the ship, historically to help (or even hoist) him aboard, in a ceremony known as tending the Side. Presently, Sideboys are used only for ceremonial purposes and not always aboard ships. For example, they may be used for Change of Command and Retirement ceremonies. Sideboys are instructed by the piping of the Boatswain's Mate. The sideboy function may be performed by either male or female members of the ship's complement. 

Since 1843, United States Navy regulations have stipulated the number of sideboys according to the importance of the guests, which are similarly entitled to other honors; viz., the number of ruffles and flourishes and the number of cannon fired as a salute. It is traditional to post sideboys to honor superior officers. Anywhere from two to eight sideboys can be placed; this depends on the officer's rank or paygrade. The President rates the maximum number of sideboys (8), as does the Vice President and the Chief of Naval Operations. Specific requirements for other dignitaries and military Officers can be found in OPNAVINST 1710.7A, the Social Usage and Protocol Handbook.

References

Military life
Water transport